The 1937 New York City mayoral election took place on November 2, 1937 in New York City. Incumbent Mayor Fiorello La Guardia, the Republican candidate, was reelected with 60.09% of the vote, defeating the Democratic candidate Jeremiah T. Mahoney, a lawyer and former New York Supreme Court justice, as well as other, third party candidates. La Guardia was also the nominee of the American Labor Party, and additionally ran on the City Fusion and Independent Progressive ballot lines, while Mahoney ran on the Trade Union and Anti-Communist party lines.

References

Mayoral election
Mayoral elections in New York City
New York City mayoral
New York City
New York City mayoral election